ShineBright is a Christian rock band from Orrville, Ohio. They were on the BEC Recordings label, which they released their first studio album on July 23, 2013 entitled Dreamers.

Background
ShineBright are from Orrville, Ohio, which Emily and Nathan started by leading youth worship services at their church, and that happened in 2007. The band solidified in 2009 with their current membership. At this time, Shine Bright Baby was spotted at the Alive Festival by the Tooth & Nail Records label, which they continued their interest, but it was not until 2012 when they were introduced to BEC Recordings by Tooth & Nail. Lastly, Emily stated that they did not get serious in making music until 2010.

According to CCM Magazine, the band took their name from Philippians 2. In addition, they told Christian Music Zine that the name was because the scripture "talks about shining brightly for Christ, just like the stars in the universe."

On September 15, 2016. ShineBright announced that they would perform their last show on November 19, 2016

Music
In October 2012, the band were signed to BEC Recordings, which is a major Christian music label in the United States.

Independent EPs
Shine Bright Baby released three independent EPs: 2008's Brace Yourself, 2009's The Heart and its Hope and 2010's Fall 2010 Sampler.

Dreamers
On July 23, 2013, Shine Bright Baby released their debut studio album entitled Dreamers on the BEC Recordings label.

"A Little More Love" Christmas Single
December 2013

Members
Current
 Emily Irene Fertig – lead vocals
 Nathan Fertig – bass guitar, programming, guitars
 Josh Fink – guitar and keys

Former
 Hudson Taylor – bass guitar, vocals
 Harley Hicks - guitars, vocals
 Karl Wendel – drums

Tour
 Nathan Head - drums

Discography

Studio albums

Singles

References

External links
 

Musical groups established in 2007
Musical groups from Ohio
BEC Recordings artists
2007 establishments in Ohio